The World of Arthur Russell is a compilation album by Arthur Russell, released in 2004 on Soul Jazz Records.

Reception

Simon Reynolds of Uncut gave the album a five star rating, but stated that the album "is splendid but in truth only scratches the surfaces of Russell's officially released work (plus there's mountains of unreleased material originally deemed too kooky for the '80s post-disco market)."

Track listing
"Go Bang" (Dinosaur L) – 7:36
"Wax the Van" (Lola) – 5:27
"Is It All Over My Face" (Loose Joints) – 6:57
"Keeping Up" (Arthur Russell) – 6:20
"In the Light of the Miracle" (Arthur Russell) – 13:21
"A Little Lost" (Arthur Russell) – 3:18
"Pop Your Funk" (Loose Joints) – 6:38
"Let's Go Swimming" (Arthur Russell) – 5:14
"In the Cornbelt" (Dinosaur L) – 5:57
"Treehouse" (Arthur Russell) – 2:17
"Schoolbell/Treehouse" (Indian Ocean) – 10:05

References

Sources
 

2004 compilation albums
Arthur Russell (musician) albums
Soul Jazz Records compilation albums